Tupe District is one of thirty-three districts of the province of Yauyos in Peru. It is home to the Jaqaru ethnolinguistic minority.

There has been much thievery going on and the police are reported to be corrupt and help the thieves in exchange for a bribe.

See also 
 Awki Sunqu
 Challwaqucha

References